Jack Richard Burton (3 November 1923 – 30 October 2001) was an Australian cricketer. He played one first-class match for South Australia in 1951/52.

See also
 List of South Australian representative cricketers

References

External links
 

1923 births
2001 deaths
Australian cricketers
South Australia cricketers